NGC 4036 is the New General Catalogue identifier for a lenticular galaxy  in the northern circumpolar constellation of Ursa Major. In the Carnegie Atlas of Galaxies, it is described as being "characterized by an irregular
pattern of dust lanes threaded through the disc in an 'embryonic' spiral pattern indicating a mixed S0/Sa form." It is located near the Big Dipper, a little to the north of the mid-way point between the stars Alpha Ursae Majoris and Delta Ursae Majoris. With a visual magnitude of 10.7, it can be dimly viewed using a  aperture telescope.

The visual dimensions of this galaxy are  arc minutes, with the major axis having a position angle of 85°. The galaxy is being viewed nearly edge-on, with an inclination of 18° to the line of sight from the Earth. The estimated visual luminosity of the galaxy is  L⊙, or 42 billion times the brightness of the Sun. Photographs show a tightly wound spiral pattern in the galactic disk, with three dust lanes—the southern side of the galaxy appears dimmer due to the dust configuration. The mass of the free gas and dust in the galaxy is about  M⊙ and  M⊙, respectively, with around  M⊙ of the gas being in an ionized state.

This is a type of active galaxy known as a LINER, which means that it shows emission lines of ionized gas in the region of its nucleus. Chemically, the stars at the center of the nucleus have a higher metallicity than in the neighboring regions. The galactic bulge itself appears triaxial with the ionized gas concentrated near the center of this bulge region. Images of the galaxy with the Hubble Space Telescope show a wispy disk of dust on all sides of the nucleus, with what appears to be the tendrilous remains of an ionization cone leading away 4 arc seconds to the northeast. Such features are common in Seyfert galaxies.

On July 23, 2007, Type Ia supernova SN 2007gi was discovered by Koichi Itagaki near the central bulge of this galaxy. It reached peak magnitude around August 14, then steadily declined in brightness thereafter. Materials identified in the spectrum included silicon, calcium, and sulfur moving outward at velocities of around 15,500 km/s. This is a 50% higher velocity than what is normally observed with supernovae of this type.

NGC 4036 is a member of the LGG 266 galaxy group, along with NGC 4041, IC 758, UGC 7009, and UGC 7019.

Gallery

References

External links 
 

Lenticular galaxies
Ursa Major (constellation)
4036
7005
037930